Saint Husik I or Husik was the 15th Catholicos-Patriarch of the Armenian Apostolic Church. He was the fourth in line, and the last Catholicoi, in the line of the Arsacid dynasty after Gregory the Illuminator, St. Aristaces I and St. Vrtanes I.

Husik was the son of Vrtanes I by an unnamed mother and had a brother called Grigoris who was martyred in Caucasian Albania (died  330–340). His paternal uncle was Aristaces I and paternal grandfather was the great Gregory the Illuminator.

Although Husik was born, educated and ordained in Caesarea Cappadocia; he also spent part of his life in the Arsacid Court of King Tigranes VII (Tiran). Husik married at some point an Arsacid Princess, who was an unnamed daughter of Tiridates III of Armenia and Ashkhen. With his wife, Husik had two sons:
 Papas (Pap), who renounced his Catholicos position in 348. He married Varazdoukht, an Arsacid Princess who was one of the sisters of Tigranes VII.
 At’anaganes, who married Bambish, an Arsacid Princess, a sister of Varazdoukht and Tigranes VII. Through his second son, Husik was the grandfather of the Catholicos, St. Nerses I.

He became the new Catholicos after his father and reigned from 341 until 347. Husik was known to be a good person. During his reign, Husik denounced the evils of King Tigranes VII and the King's courtiers. He went so far at one point, Husik tried to ban Tigranes VII and his associates from the church at the time of a festival. For this act that Husik did to King Tigranes VII and his associates, Husik died as a Christian martyr from being clubbed to death. Husik along with his brother and members of his family are all Saints in the Armenian Apostolic Church.

References

Sources
 M.H. Dodgeon & S.N.C Lieu, The Roman eastern Frontier and the Persian Wars (AD 226–363): a documentary history, Part 1, Routledge, 1994
 C. Toumanoff, Manuel de généalogie et de chronologie pour le Caucase chrétien (Arménie, Géorgie, Albanie) [détail des éditions], p. 74
 R. Grousset, Histoire de l’Arménie des origines à 1071, Paris, Payot, 1947 (réimpr. 1973, 1984, 1995, 2008), 644, pp. 127–130
 The Armenian Church – Mother See of Holy Etchmiadzin: Establishment of the Armenian Church
 P’awstos Buzandac’i’s, History of the Armenians

See also
 Gregorids

340s deaths
Armenian saints
Catholicoi of Armenia
Saints of the Armenian Apostolic Church
Year of birth unknown
4th-century Christian martyrs